The 2018 Eastleigh Borough Council election took place on 3 May 2018 to elect all members of Eastleigh Borough Council. The election was on new boundaries, with the overall size of the council being reduced by five seats, from 44 to 39.  The outcome was a decisive victory for the incumbent Liberal Democrats.

Results

Ward Results

A * denotes an incumbent councillor seeking reelection.

Bishopstoke

Botley

Bursledon & Hound North

Chandler's Ford

Eastleigh Central

Eastleigh North

Eastleigh South

Fair Oak & Horton Heath

Hamble & Netley

Hedge End North

Hedge End South

Hiltingbury

West End North

West End South

References 

Eastleigh Borough Council elections
2018 English local elections